Tugalina gigas is a species of sea snail, a marine gastropod mollusk in the family Fissurellidae, the keyhole limpets and slit limpets.

Habitat
This species is found in the following habitats:
 Brackish
 Marine

References

 Sasaki T. (2017). Family Fissurellidae. Pp. 775-779, in: T. Okutani (ed.), Marine Mollusks in Japan, ed. 2. 2 vols. Tokai University Press. 1375 pp.

External links
 Martens, E. von (1881). Description of non-marine Mollusca. Conchologische Mittheilungen, 2 (1/2): 103-128, 5 pls
 To Biodiversity Heritage Library (1 publication)
 To GenBank (1 nucleotides; 0 proteins)
 To World Register of Marine Species

Fissurellidae
Gastropods described in 1881